A P+S Technik Mini35 adapter is a depth-of-field adapter for use with 35 mm lenses on a video camera while maintaining identical depth of field and angle of view as the same lens on a 35 mm camera.

The original concept of the adapter was achieved by a German cinematographer. It is manufactured and distributed by the German camera manufacturer P+S Technik.

The first film completed within the United States to solely utilize the Mini35 adapter is The Provoker, written and directed by Phillip Cappe, completed and screened in March 2002.

External links 
  
P+S Technik

Film and video technology